Lorenzo Marugo (born 31 January 1952 in Genoa) is an Italian former swimmer who competed in the 1972 Summer Olympics.

References

1952 births
Living people
Sportspeople from Genoa
Italian male swimmers
Italian male freestyle swimmers
Male medley swimmers
Olympic swimmers of Italy
Swimmers at the 1972 Summer Olympics
Mediterranean Games gold medalists for Italy
Mediterranean Games medalists in swimming
Swimmers at the 1975 Mediterranean Games